Tracey Richardson (born 26 October 1982 in Hornchurch, Greater London, England, UK) is a British diver.

Career
2001 - Competed in the World Championships in Fukuoka, Japan.
2003 - World Diving Championships at the European Champions Cup in Stockholm, Sweden.
2004 - She competed in the 3 metre springboard at the 2004 Summer Olympics in Athens finishing 26th.

Richardson trains at the Southend diving club.

References

External links
British Olympic Association
BBC Sport

1982 births
Living people
English female divers
Divers at the 2004 Summer Olympics
Olympic divers of Great Britain